Goniodoris felis is a species of sea slug, a dorid nudibranch, a marine gastropod mollusc in the family Goniodorididae.

Distribution
This species was first described from Japan. It also occurs in Hong Kong and South Korea.

Description
This goniodorid nudibranch is translucent pink in colour, with large areas of white surface pigment on the oral tentacles, along the pallial margin and back and sides of the body.

Ecology
Goniodoris felis probably feeds on bryozoans or colonial ascidians but the diet is apparently not yet determined.

References

Goniodorididae
Gastropods described in 1949